Margaret Clay Ferguson was an American botanist best known for advancing scientific education in the field of botany. She also contributed on the life histories of North American pines.

She was born in Orleans, New York in 1863 and attended the Genesee Wesleyan Seminary in Lima, New York. Ferguson attended Wellesley College, where she graduated in botany and chemistry in 1891, receiving her PhD in botany from Cornell University in 1901.

She was the first female President of the Botanical Society of America in 1929.

Career
She became professor of botany and head of the department at Wellesley College in 1930. She collected botany specimens with her niece Alice Maria Ottley.

Ferguson worked on a variety of systems including Fungi, Pine and Petunia. Her study on the latter revealed how plant flower color and pattern do not follow Mendelian laws of inheritance. Ferguson encouraged many women botanists during her time at Wellesley College where lab work was a major of her teaching.

In 1931 Susan Minns donated funds to Wellesley College to support Ferguson in her research.  In 1932, Ferguson retired from Wellesley College, though she continued researching until 1938.   She received an Honorary doctorate from Mount Holyoke.

In her later years, she spent time in Florida before moving to San Diego where she died of a heart attack in 1951.

Greenhouses in the Wellesley College Botanic Gardens are named in her honor.

Taxonomist

See also
Timeline of women in science

References

1863 births
1951 deaths
American women botanists
Botanists active in North America
Botanical Society of America
Wellesley College faculty
Cornell University College of Agriculture and Life Sciences alumni
Wellesley College alumni
People from Jefferson County, New York
Scientists from New York (state)
19th-century American botanists
20th-century American botanists
19th-century American women scientists
20th-century American women scientists
American women academics